The Battle of Waynesboro is a name given to two different battles during the American Civil War:
 Battle of Waynesboro, Virginia, March 2, 1865
 Battle of Waynesboro, Georgia, December 4, 1864